Hòa Lạc Air Base is a Vietnam People's Air Force (VPAF) (Không quân Nhân dân Việt Nam) military airfield located approximately  west of Hanoi.

History

Vietnam War
The airfield started operation in February 1967. On 26 March 1967 Col Robert Scott flying an F-105 shot down a Hòa Lạc-based MiG-17. In May the base was first attacked by the USAF.

Hòa Lạc, Kép and Phúc Yên were targeted on the first night of Operation Linebacker II on 18 December 1972 to suppress fighters that might otherwise intercept US attack aircraft.

Current use
The VPAF 916th Helicopter Squadron is based at Hòa Lạc.

On 7 July 2014 a VPAF Mi-171 crashed while on a parachute training mission near Hòa Lạc killing 17 passengers and crew.

References

Installations of the Vietnam People's Air Force
Military airbases established in 1967